William Wells Church (December 17, 1874 – March 28, 1966) was an American football player and coach. A native of Chicago, he played college football at Princeton University, where he was selected as an All-American at tackle in 1896. He served as the head football coach at Purdue University for one season, in 1897, and at Georgetown University for two seasons, in 1899 and 1901, compiling a career college football record of 5–3–1. Church participated in early professional football: He played tackle for the Duquesne Country and Athletic Club in 1898 and the Homestead Library & Athletic Club in 1900, also coaching the latter team. He married Mary Myrtle Brock in 1902.

He later resided in Oklahoma City, Oklahoma, where he died in 1966.

Head coaching record

References

External links
 

1874 births
1966 deaths
19th-century players of American football
American football tackles
Georgetown Hoyas football coaches
Princeton Tigers football players
Duquesne Country and Athletic Club players
Homestead Library & Athletic Club players
Purdue Boilermakers football coaches
All-American college football players
Players of American football from Chicago